Kumar Khadka is a Nepali politician of Nepali Congress and Minister in Gandaki government since 12 June 2021. As of 2013, he was the chairman of the Akhanda Nepal Party which later on joined Nepali Congress ahead of the 2017 Nepalese local elections. He is also serving as member of the Gandaki Province Provincial Assembly. Khadka was elected to the 2017 provincial assembly elections from proportional list of the party. He including three other ministers joined Krishna Chandra Nepali cabinet in first lot. He joined Krishna Chandra Nepali cabinet as Minister for Physical Infrastructure Development, Urban Development and Transport Management on 12 June 2021.

References 

Living people
Nepali Congress politicians from Gandaki Province
Year of birth missing (living people)
21st-century Nepalese politicians
Provincial cabinet ministers of Nepal
Members of the Provincial Assembly of Gandaki Province
Members of the 2nd Nepalese Constituent Assembly